The following is an overview of the year 2008 in Japanese music. It includes notable awards, lists of number-ones, yearly best-sellers, albums released, groups established and disestablished, deaths of notable Japanese music-related people as well as any other relevant Japanese music-related events. For overviews of the year in music from other countries, see 2008 in music.

Events
December 31 – 29th NHK Kōhaku Uta Gassen

Awards
May 30 – 2008 MTV Video Music Awards Japan
December 30 – 50th Japan Record Awards

Number-ones
Oricon number-one albums
Oricon number-one singles
Hot 100 number-one singles

Best-sellers

Artists

Albums
The following is a list of the top 10 best-selling albums in Japan in 2008, according to Oricon.

Albums released
The following section includes albums by Japanese artists released in Japan in 2008 as well as Japanese-language albums by foreign artists released in the country during this year.
January 1 – Guilty by Ayumi Hamasaki
January 23 - Night Fishing by Sakanaction
January 30 – Kingdom by Kumi Koda
January 30 – Darling by Yui Horie
February 13 – Award Supernova: Loves Best by M-Flo
February 13 – Love Is... by Sachi Tainaka
February 20 – Complete Single Collection '97–'08 by The Brilliant Green
February 27 – The Face by BoA
February 27 – Daiji na Mono by Idoling!!!
February 27 – Izayoi no Tsuki, Canaria no Koi. by Yukari Tamura
March 5 – World World World by Asian Kung-Fu Generation
March 12 – Kyokuto Symphony: The Five Stars Night @Budokan by Nightmare
March 12 – Namida no Kiseki by Ai Nonaka
March 19 – Heart Station by Hikaru Utada
March 26 –  by Exile
March 26 – Shion by MUCC
April 2 – Hikari Nadeshiko by Eiko Shimamiya
April 9 – Gokutama Rock Cafe by An Cafe
April 9 – I Loved Yesterday by Yui
April 16 – Game by Perfume
April 23 – Dream "A" Live by Arashi
May 14 – Superfly by Superfly
June 4 – KAT-TUN III: Queen of Pirates by KAT-TUN
June 18 – B'z The Best "Ultra Pleasure" by B'z
June 23 – Hayley Sings Japanese Songs by Hayley Westenra
June 25 – Ā, Domo. Ohisashiburi Desu. by Greeeen
June 25 – Honey by Chara
July 9 – Panic Fancy by Orange Range
July 11 – Envy/Jesu by Envy and Jesu
July 20 – Best Fiction by Namie Amuro
July 23 – Hakai by Wagdug Futuristic Unity
July 23 – Love & Peace by Emi Tawata
July 30 – Best Fiction by Namie Amuro
September 3 – Arigatō by Hatsune Okumura
September 10 – 5 by Berryz Kobo
September 10 – A Complete: All Singles by Ayumi Hamasaki
September 17 – B'z The Best "Ultra Treasure" by B'z
September 24 – Fairy Dance: Kokia Meets Ireland by Kokia
November 5 – Best Destiny by Miliyah Kato
November 11 – Uroboros by Dir En Grey
November 12 – Kanjō Effect by One Ok Rock
November 12 – My Short Stories by Yui
November 19 – More! More! More! by Capsule
November 19 – Color by NEWS
November 26 – Voice by Mika Nakashima
December 3 –  by Exile
December 3 – Me... by Emi Hinouchi
December 10 – Awake -Evoke the Urge- by Deathgaze
December 12 – Supermarket Fantasy by Mr. Children
December 17 – Kirari to Fuyu by Koharu Kusumi
December 17 – Love Letter by Ai Otsuka

Groups established
Afilia Saga
Dempagumi.inc
Girl Next Door
Hangry & Angry
Happiness
no3b
Momoiro Clover Z
SKE48
Shugo Chara Egg!
Watarirouka Hashiritai 7

Groups disestablished
Athena & Robikerottsu

See also
 2008 in Japan
 2008 in Japanese television
 List of Japanese films of 2008

References